Gavivina Tamakloe is a Ghanaian veteran actor who has featured in a lot of movies. He is known for the role he played in the Ghanaian TV series Taxi Driver as “Pastor Gbetoreme”. He hails from Wuti, Keta District in the Volta Region

Education 
He studied drama and theatre arts and English at the University of Ghana, Legon and then continue to  University Of Oslo, Norway respectively for his master's degree.

Career 
Gavivina started his acting career as a stage performer in 1986,he then joined the Theatre group company called the Talents Theatre Company which was partially owned by National Mobilization Program, headed by Mr Kofi Portorphi. Through this he acted with the likes of David Dontoh, Anima Missa, Kofi Dovlo,  and many others who understood the basics of stage acting.

Filmography 
List of movies.

 Taxi Driver
 Sun City
 Heart of Men
 Bleeding Love 1 & 2
 Princess Tyra 1,2 & 3 
 Crime to Christ 1,2 &3 
 Expensive Vow 1 & 2
 Save My Love 1 & 2

References 

Ghanaian male actors
Living people
21st-century Ghanaian male actors
Year of birth missing (living people)